Yvonne de Pfeffel (30 July 1883 – 1958) was a French tennis player in the first decade of the 20th century.

Early life and ancestry
Yvonne was born as the younger daughter of Baron Christian Hubert Theodor Marie Karl Pfeffel von Kriegelstein (1843-1922), son of Baron Karl Maximilian Friedrich Hubert Pfeffel von Krigenstein (1811-1890) and Karoline Adelheid Pauline von Rottenburg, natural daughter of Prince Paul of Württemberg. Her mother was Hélène Arnous de Rivière (1862-1951), daughter of French chess champion Jules Arnous de Rivière and his wife Joséphine de Coulhac Mazérieux (1834–1921). She had an elder sister, Marie Louise Pfeffel von Kriegelstein (1882-1944) who was the great-grandmother of Boris Johnson, the British Prime Minister.

Tennis career
In 1907 she won the inaugural doubles title at the closed French Championships partnering Adine Masson. Together with Max Decugis she won the French mixed championships in 1905 and 1906. In the French singles championships she was a runner-up in 1905, losing the final in straight sets to Kate Gillou. She was a member of Tennis-Club d'Auteuil and played doubles with her sister Marie-Louise.

In February 1902 the Tennis Club de Paris organized a ping pong tournament which was won by Yvonne who defeated her sister Marie-Louise in the final.

References

1883 births
1958 deaths
French female tennis players
French Championships (tennis) champions